Tony Korioth (March 16, 1933 – May 29, 2004) was an American politician who served in the Texas House of Representatives from district 49-F from 1957 to 1961.

He died on May 29, 2004, in Austin, Texas at age 71.

References

1933 births
2004 deaths
Democratic Party members of the Texas House of Representatives
20th-century American politicians